Hoplitimyia is a genus of flies in the family Stratiomyidae.

Species
Hoplitimyia aleus (Walker, 1849)
Hoplitimyia bellardii Woodley, 2001
Hoplitimyia clavata James, 1939
Hoplitimyia constans (Loew, 1872)
Hoplitimyia costalis (Walker, 1836)
Hoplitimyia inbioensis Woodley, 2008
Hoplitimyia mutabilis (Fabricius, 1787)
Hoplitimyia panamensis James, 1979
Hoplitimyia semiluna James, 1939
Hoplitimyia taurina James, 1979

References

Stratiomyidae
Brachycera genera
Diptera of South America
Diptera of North America